Ronald Lindsay was a diplomat.

Ronald Lindsay may also refer to:

Ronald A. Lindsay past president and CEO of the Center for Inquiry
Ronald Lindsay of the Lindsay Baronets